Mumladze is a Georgian surname. Notable people with the surname include:

Meri Mumladze (born 2001), Georgian swimmer
Shalva Mumladze (born 1978), Georgian footballer

Surnames of Georgian origin
Georgian-language surnames